The Stavnic is a left tributary of the river Bârlad in Romania. It discharges into the Bârlad in Vulturești. The Căzănești Dam is located on the Stavnic.

References

Rivers of Romania
Rivers of Iași County
Rivers of Vaslui County